Abdullah Al-Salman (born 5 May 1994) is a Saudi footballer who plays for Al-Rayyan as a winger.

References

1994 births
Living people
Saudi Arabian footballers
Association football wingers
Al-Taawoun FC players
Al-Nahda Club (Saudi Arabia) players
Al-Najma SC players
Al-Rayyan Club (Saudi Arabia) players
Saudi Professional League players
Saudi First Division League players
Saudi Second Division players